Lieutenant General Lawrence Mbatha is the current Chief of the South African Army. He was appointed to this position in April 2020, before being appointed Chief of the Army he was the General Officer Commanding of the  South african National Defence Force Training Command and before that he was the 19th Commandant of the South African Military Academy.

Military career 
He joined Umkhonto we Sizwe in 1984 and completed courses in Angola and Zimbabwe.

He integrated into the South African National Defence Force in 1994 and served as a Company Commander at 3 SA Infantry Battalion.

He was promoted to colonel in 2003. In 2003 he served as Officer Commanding of the General Support Base in Johannesburg, followed by an appointment as Principal Staff Officer to the Chief of the Army (2007) before serving as Officer Commanding of the South African Army Gymnasium in 2011. During this time he completed the British Army Staff Course. He was promoted to brigadier general in 2012. Commandant of the South African Military Academy in 2012-2018. GOC Training Command at Human Resources Division in 2018 to 2020.

References

Living people
South African Army generals
Year of birth missing (living people)
Graduates of the Joint Services Command and Staff College
UMkhonto we Sizwe personnel